Gary King (born 26 May 1996) is a Zimbabwean cricketer. He made his Twenty20 cricket debut for Munster Reds in the 2017 Inter-Provincial Trophy in Ireland on 26 May 2017.

References

External links
 

1996 births
Living people
Zimbabwean cricketers
Munster Reds cricketers
Place of birth missing (living people)